Underland Press is a publishing company founded by Victoria Blake, a writer and the former prose editor for Dark Horse Comics. Underland Press was sold to Resurrection House in September 2013.

Debut authors for Underland Press included: Bram Stoker Award winner Kealan Patrick Burke, Edgar Award and International Horror Guild Award nominee Brian Evenson, Two-time World Fantasy Award winner Jeff VanderMeer, multiple award winner Will Elliott, and husband and wife writing team Berry Verhoef and Esther Verhoef writing as "EScoBER".

Will Elliott's novel The Pilo Family Circus is scheduled to make its North American debut in 2009 through Underland Press. It was originally published in Australia in 2006 after winning the inaugural ABC fiction award (sponsored by ABC Books). The novel went on to win the Aurealis Award (co-winner: Best Horror novel, plus the Golden Aurealis Award), the Australian Shadows Award, the Ditmar Award (Best Novel), and the Sydney Morning Herald's "Best Young Novelist Award" for 2007. The Pilo Family Circus was also short-listed for the 2007 International Horror Guild Award for Best Novel.

Kealan Patrick Burke's online-only interactive Wovel, The Living debuted June 1, 2008 on the official Underland Press website.

Releases

Novels
Last Days, by Brian Evenson (February 2009) Released in the following formats:
Perfect Bound Trade Paperback 
48 copy Limited Edition hardcover
27 Lettered Edition hardcover
The Pilo Family Circus, by Will Elliott (March 2009) 
Finch, by Jeff VanderMeer (scheduled November 2009) 
Chaos, by Escober (AKA Esther Verhoef and Berry Verhoef) (May 2009) 
The Complete Drive-In: Omnibus by Joe R. Lansdale (May 2010) 
Curse of the Wolf Girl by Martin Millar (August 2010)

Story Collections
In Extremis: The Most Extreme Short Stories of John Shirley by John Shirley – August 2011
Cyberpunk: Stories of Hardware, Software, Wetware, Evolution, and Revolution edited by Victoria Blake – February 2013

Omnibuses

The Complete Drive-In (2010) by Joe R. Lansdale, compiles the first three novels

Anthologies
Real Unreal: Best American Fantasy 3, edited by Kevin Brockmeier (scheduled January 2010). Featuring stories by Stephen King, Peter S. Beagle, Laura Kasischke, Jeffrey Ford, Lisa Goldstein, Paul Tremblay, Will Clarke, Thomas Glave, John Kessel, Kellie Wells, Ryan Boudinot, Rebecca Makkai, Martin Cozza, Chris Gavaler, Deborah Scwartzand, Shawn Vestal, and Katie Williams.

Wovels 
The Living, a Wovel by Kealan Patrick Burke (June 2008 – October 2008)
FirstWorld, a Wovel by Jemiah Jefferson (November 2008 – April 2009)
Exit Vector, a Wovel by Simon Drax (June 2009 – current)

References

External links
 Underland Press official site
 The Living, a Wovel on Underland Press official site

2008 establishments in Oregon
American speculative fiction publishers
Book publishing companies based in Oregon
Companies based in Portland, Oregon
Horror book publishing companies
Privately held companies based in Oregon
Publishing companies established in 2008
Small press publishing companies